The following is a timeline of the history of the city of L'Aquila in the Abruzzo, a region of Italy.

Prior to 20th century

 1240 – Settlement founded by Frederick II, Holy Roman Emperor (approximate date).
 1257 – Roman Catholic diocese of L'Aquila active.
 1259 – Town sacked by forces of Manfred, King of Sicily.
 1266 – Rebuilding of town by Charles I of Naples begins.
 1272
  construction begins.
  (fountain) built.
 1288 – Santa Maria di Collemaggio church consecrated near town.
 1300 – Cathedral of San Massimo construction begins (approximate date).
 1308 –  (church) built.
 1309 –  (church) construction begins.
 1315 – Earthquake.(it)
 1349 – Earthquake.(it)
 1423 – War of L'Aquila begins.
 1461 – .
 1469 – Santa Maria del Soccorso church construction begins.(it)
 1472 – Basilica of San Bernardino built.
 1482 – Printing press in operation.
 1510 –  built (approximate date).
 1517 –  built in the Santa Maria di Collemaggio church.
 1521 – Spaniards in power.
 1534 – Forte Spagnolo (fort) built.
 1596 - L'aquilanum Collegium founded.
 1646 – Earthquake.
 1647 –  consecrated.
 1657 – Plague outbreak.
 1703 – 14 January: Earthquake.
 1713 - Santa Maria del Suffragio construction begins.
 1719 – Accademia degli Arcadi Colonia Aternina founded.
 1725 –  (church) built.
 1743 –  built.
 1745 – Santa Caterina Martire church built (approximate date).(it)
 1756 –  built (approximate date).
 1775 – Santa Maria del Suffragio church completed.
 1786 – Earthquake.(it)
 1799 – L'Aquila sacked by French forces.
 1875 – L'Aquila railway station opens; Sulmona-L'Aquila railway begins operating.
 1876 – Roman Catholic Archdiocese of L'Aquila established.
 1897 – Population: 21,202.

20th century

 1901 - Population: 21,261.
 1922 –  (railway) begins operating.
 1927 – L'Aquila Calcio 1927 (football club) formed.
 1934 –  (cable car) begins operating.
 1950 – Museo Nazionale d'Abruzzo (museum) established.
 1952 – Istituto Universitario di Magistero and Alpine Botanical Garden of Campo Imperatore established.
 1966 –  becomes mayor.
 1968 – L'Aquila–Preturo Airport built.
 1969 – Accademia di Belle Arti dell'Aquila (school) established.
 1984 – Traforo del Gran Sasso (road tunnel) opens near city.
 1990 – Italian Society for General Relativity and Gravitation founded.
 1991 – Gran Sasso e Monti della Laga National Park in vicinity of L'Aquila.
 1998 –  held;  becomes mayor.

21st century

 2007 –  held; Massimo Cialente becomes mayor.
 2009
 6 April: 2009 L'Aquila earthquake.
 July: International 35th G8 summit held in L'Aquila.
 2013 – Population: 68,304.
 2016 –  (stadium) opens.
 2017 - Basilica di Collemaggio reopened.

See also
 
  (medieval city history)
 List of mayors of L'Aquila
 List of bishops of L'Aquila
  region

Other cities in the macroregion of South Italy:(it)
 Timeline of Bari, Apulia region
 Timeline of Brindisi, Apulia
 Timeline of Naples, Campania region
 Timeline of Reggio Calabria
 Timeline of Salerno, Campania
 Timeline of Taranto, Apulia

References

This article incorporates information from the Italian Wikipedia.

Bibliography

in English

in Italian

 
 
  (includes chronology)
 
 L. Serra. Aquila (Bergamo, 1929)
 G. Spagnesi and P. L. Properzi. L’Aquila: Problemi di forma e storia della città (Bari, 1972)
 M. Ruggiero Petrignani. Egemonia politica e forma urbana: L’Aquila, città come fabbrica di potere e di consenso nel medioevo italiano (Bari, 1980)
 
 A. Clementi and E. Piroddi. L’Aquila, Le città nella storia d’Italia (Rome, 1986)

External links

 Archivio di Stato dell'Aquila (state archives)
 Items related to L'Aquila, various dates (via Europeana)
 Items related to L'Aquila, various dates (via Digital Public Library of America)

L'Aquila
L'Aquila
L'Aquila